Peattie is a surname. Notable people with the surname include:

Charles Peattie (born 1958), British cartoonist
Donald C. Peattie (1898–1964), American botanist
Elia W. Peattie (1862–1935), author
Mark Peattie, American historian